Mark Denney (born 25 January 1975) is a former rugby union footballer who played at centre for Bedford, Bristol, Castres, Wasps and Cambridge University. Whilst at Wasps he helped them win the Tetley Bitter Cup Final in 1999 and 2000; scoring a try in the latter final. He was a member of the Wasps team that won the 2002–03 Premiership Final, the 2003–04 Premiership Final and the 2004 Heineken Cup Final. He was educated at Bedford Modern School, Bristol University and Cambridge University. In 2015 (Aged 40) he spent a season, with his mates, playing for the all conquering Olney Vets RFC in the inaugural East Midlands Vets League Final.

Denney was called up to the senior England squad for the 2000 Six Nations Championship.

References

External links 
Bristol Profile
Wasps profile

1975 births
Living people
English rugby union players
People educated at Bedford Modern School
Rugby union players from Essex
Bedford Blues players
Cambridge University R.U.F.C. players
Bristol Bears players
Wasps RFC players
Rugby union centres